Lauren Siddall, (born 1 November 1984 in Pontefract, England) is an English professional squash player who represented England as a junior. She reached a career-high world ranking of World No. 37 in October 2008.

As of 2016, Siddall had won the Namibian Squash Open Championships a record four times.

References

External links 

English female squash players
Living people
1984 births
Sportspeople from Pontefract